Linda Mastandrea is a civil rights and disability attorney, author and former Paralympic athlete. She was a Paralympic and World champion in wheelchair racing.

Early life
Linda is the youngest twin in a second set of twins, her twin sister is Laura. She and Laura have older twin siblings and they have a younger brother. Linda was diagnosed with spastic diplegia cerebral palsy at a very young age when she found walking difficult and was often carried around.

Sporting career
Mastandrea represented the United States in the 1990s, she participated at the 1996 Summer Paralympics, three World Para Athletics Championships, Parapan American Games and the Stoke Mandeville Wheelchair Games winning a total of twenty medals, she had also set national, world and Paralympic records during her career. In 2010, she was the first female Paralympic athlete to be inducted into the National Italian American Sports Hall of Fame.

In 2009, Mastandrea participated in the Chicago 2016 Olympic and Paralympic Games bid trying to win the rights to host the 2016 Summer Olympics where she worked alongside the-then President Barack Obama, First Lady Michelle Obama and mayor of Chicago Richard M. Daley. The 2016 Games were eventually won by Rio de Janeiro.

References

Living people
Track and field athletes from Chicago
Paralympic track and field athletes of the United States
American female wheelchair racers
Athletes (track and field) at the 1996 Summer Paralympics
Medalists at the 1996 Summer Paralympics
World Para Athletics Championships winners
American women writers
American women lawyers
Year of birth missing (living people)